Lu Min (November12, 1926December21, 2000)  was a MiG-15 pilot of the People's Republic of China. Born in Longkou, Shandong Province, he was a flying ace during the Korean War, with eight victories.

He was a member of the 12th Fighter Aviation Division. He was later purged due to alleged connections with Marshal Lin Biao's coup attempt against Mao Zedong.

Although all Chinese aces have received the title Combat Hero in acknowledgement of their services, very little information is known of the Chinese pilots during the war due to the lack of published records.

Lu Min died on December 21, 2000.

See also 
List of Korean War flying aces

References

Sources 

Chinese Korean War flying aces
Chinese military personnel of the Korean War
People from Yantai
1926 births
2000 deaths
People of the Republic of China